The 2011–12 Barako Bull Energy was the 10th season of the franchise in the Philippine Basketball Association (PBA). The team was previously known as the Air21 Express during the 2010–11 season.

Key dates
August 28: The 2011 PBA Draft took place in Robinson's Place Ermita, Manila.

Draft picks

Roster

Philippine Cup

Eliminations

Standings

Bracket

Quarterfinals

Talk 'N Text vs. Barako Bull

Commissioner's Cup

Eliminations

Standings

Bracket

Quarterfinals

Alaska–Barako Bull series

Semifinals

Talk 'N Text–Barako Bull series

Governors Cup

Eliminations

Standings

6th-seed playoffs

Transactions

Pre-season

Trades

Philippine Cup

Trades

Commissioner's Cup

Trades

Additions

Subtractions

Recruited imports

References

Barako Bull Energy seasons
Barako Bull